The Hyperions is an action comedy superhero film directed by Jon McDonald. It is distributed by The Daily Wire in the United States.

Premise 
In 1960, Professor Ruckus invented the Titan badge - a device that enables humans to have a particular superpower. Cut to 1979 when two of the original superheroes are all grown up and want their Titan badges back.

Cast 
 Cary Elwes as Professor Ruckus Mandulbaum
 Penelope Mitchell as Vista Mandulbaum
 Elaine Tan as Maya
 Alphonso McAuley as Ansel
 Cristian Fagins as young Ansel
 Tanner Buchanan as Apollo
 Keli Price as Ares
 Paris Benjamin as French Nurse
 Thomas Bromhead as Announcer
 Keli Daniels as Judy
 Jacques Derosena
 Judy Elle as Sarah
 Annie Korzen as Sandra
 Sal Lopez as Delano
 Caitlyn Friedlander as Ruby
 Josh Harp as Masked Goon #1
 R.J. Asher as Bank Robber / Masked Goon #2
 Anais Lilit as Assistant #2

Release 
The film was released exclusively to subscribers of The Daily Wire on 10 March 2022, after a free premiere on YouTube.

Reception 

Richard Propes, of The Independent Critic, rated the film 3.5/4, saying, "The Hyperions isn't actually a perfect motion picture, however, that imperfection may very well make it a more effective motion picture." Alan Ng, of Film Threat, rated the film 7.5/10, saying, "In the end, The Hyperions is good, not great…worse, with the potential to be great."

References 

British superhero films
British action comedy films
2022 films
2020s English-language films